The 1974–75 St. John's Redmen basketball team represented St. John's University during the 1974–75 NCAA Division I men's basketball season. The team was coached by Lou Carnesecca in his seventh year at the school. St. John's home games are played at Alumni Hall and Madison Square Garden.

Roster

Schedule and results

|-
!colspan=9 style="background:#FF0000; color:#FFFFFF;"| Regular season

|-
!colspan=9 style="background:#FF0000; color:#FFFFFF;"| ECAC Metro tournament

|-
!colspan=9 style="background:#FF0000; color:#FFFFFF;"| NIT tournament

Team players drafted into the NBA

References

St. John's Red Storm men's basketball seasons
St. John's
St John
St John